Burrafirth links (Old Norse: Borgarfjorðr, meaning "the fjord with a castle") is a strip of land with a few houses on the island of Unst, Shetland, Scotland. It separates the fjord Burra Firth from the Loch of Cliff.

Burrafirth is said to have once been home to a giant called Saxi, who, together with another giant, was lured away by a mermaid.

References

External links

Canmore - Unst, Burra Firth, Burgar Stack site record 
Canmore - Unst, Burra Firth, Norse Mill site record
Canmore - Noah's Ark: Burrafirth, Unst, North Sea site record
Mysterious Britain - Burrafirth

Villages in Unst
Underwater diving sites in Scotland
Firths of Scotland